The Chandra Choodeswarar Temple is an ancient Shiva temple located on a rocky hill in the town of Hosur, Krishnagiri District, Tamil Nadu.

Due to variations in the local languages (Tamil, Kannada, Telugu) and dialects, the temple is also referred to as 'Chandira Choodeshwarar', 'Chandra Choodeshwara', 'Chandra Choodeshwar', 'Shri Choodeswarar' or 'Arulmigu Chandra Choodeshwarar'.

The main deities of the temple are Shiva, depicted as the Shiva linga and the Goddess Parvati, depicted as 'Maragathambal'.

Names of the main deities

'Chandra Choodeswarar' means the Eshwara who wears the Moon (Chandra) as an ornament on his crest or tuft of hair on top of the head.

Shiva's consort Parvathi is worshiped here as Maragathambal. ‘Maragatham’ means green and ‘Ambal’ means mother. This is in reference to the green plants and trees (Photosynthesis), which provide sustenance to all living beings.

Temple history
The exact history of the temple is not clearly documented. Considering that the Hosur region is mentioned in ancient Hindu texts like the 'Padmagiri Mahathyamam', a part of Brahmanda Purana, a shrine for Shiva is deemed to have existed here from ancient times.

The temple has grown during the time of the Cholas, Hoysala and Vijayanagara Emperors. The Chandra Choodeshwara Temple structure may have been built by the Hoysala king, Thirupuvanamalla Barvatharaja Anthiyazhvar, in the year 1260. The 13th-century inscription found during Chandra Choodeshwara temple patronage. Perumal Temple in Hosur and Bangalore Shiva Temple inscriptions tell the details of donations to Chandra Choodeshwara temple. There are also inscriptions of Rajendra Chola in this ancient temple. The temple was renovated by Azhakiya Perumal Aathimoolam.

In popular culture

The Chandra Choodeshwarar Temple has been the subject of documentary in an episode of TV9's series Heegu Unte in 2013.

References

External links
 Bangalore Press website
 http://www.dinamalar.com/special_detail.asp?id=1729709&Print=1

Hindu temples in Krishnagiri district
Shiva temples in Krishnagiri district
13th-century Hindu temples
Shiva temples